The Limpopo Division of the High Court of South Africa is a superior court of law with general jurisdiction over the Limpopo province of South Africa. The main seat of the court in Polokwane opened on 25 January 2016. The court also has local seats at Thohoyandou and Lephalale. Before the opening of the division, the Gauteng Division at Pretoria had jurisdiction over Limpopo and circuit courts sat at Polokwane.

History
Until 1994, the area that is now Limpopo was part of the Transvaal Province and was within the jurisdiction of the Transvaal Provincial Division (now the Gauteng Division). In July 1979 a High Court was established for the Venda bantustan. In September of the same year Venda became nominally independent from South Africa, and its court became the Supreme Court of Venda, although decisions of the court could still be appealed to the Appellate Division of the Supreme Court of South Africa. When Venda was reincorporated into South Africa in 1994 the court continued to exist, and when the current Constitution of South Africa came into force it became one of the High Courts. It was known as the Venda Division until 2009, when it received the name of "Limpopo High Court, Thohoyandou". In 2013, in the restructuring brought about by the Superior Courts Act, the court at Thohoyandou became a local seat of the Limpopo Division, with the main seat to be established at Polokwane.

References

External links
 Decisions of the Limpopo Division, Polokwane
 Decisions of the Limpopo Division, Thohoyandou

High Court of South Africa
High Court
Polokwane
Thohoyandou
1979 establishments in South Africa
Courts and tribunals established in 1979